Benjamin Hubbard House is a historic home located near Moravian Falls, North Carolina in Wilkes County. The original section was built in 1778, and is a single-pen, side-gabled log house with a hall and parlor plan. Frame additions were made to the house in the 1790s and about 1870.  Also on the property is the contributing two-story, log bank barn, dating to 1846.

It was listed on the National Register of Historic Places in 2009.

References

Log houses in the United States
Houses on the National Register of Historic Places in North Carolina
Houses completed in 1778
Houses in Wilkes County, North Carolina
National Register of Historic Places in Wilkes County, North Carolina
Log buildings and structures on the National Register of Historic Places in North Carolina